Vunivalu may refer to
Vunivalu of Bau, a Fijian nobility title
Samuela Vunivalu (born c. 1957), Fijian politician and rugby union player
Suliasi Vunivalu (born 1995), Fijian rugby league footballer